Dustin William Pague (born August 5, 1987) is a former American mixed martial artist who most recently fought in the Bantamweight division of the UFC. He was a competitor on Spike TV's The Ultimate Fighter: Team Bisping vs. Team Miller, and has formerly competed as a Lightweight and Featherweight.

Pague is currently a professional boxer after announcing his switch from MMA in January 2016.

Background
Pague began boxing when he was 15 years old and graduated from Central Dauphin East High School, then attended Harrisburg Area Community College but transferred before eventually earning a degree. Six months after viewing a video of a UFC event, Pague began his amateur career.

After suffering a series of back injuries throughout his MMA career, Pague decided to make the transition to professional boxing as a way to continue fighting and reduce the daily strain he was putting on his back.

Professional boxing career 
Pague won his professional boxing debut on April 19, 2016, by unanimous decision over Rafael Davis.

Mixed martial arts career

Early career
In late 2008, Pague made the decision to turn professional after a successful 7–4 amateur career. Pague's pro debut took place on October 11, 2008, against Jon Owens. The fight was contested at Featherweight instead of Lightweight, where Pague spent the entirety of his amateur career. Pague lost the fight via KO in only 18 seconds. Two months after the loss, Pague returned against John Myers. He won the fight via kimura submission in round one.

Pague built up a five-fight win streak before losing three straight fights to future TUF contestant Jeff Lentz, WEC veteran Anthony Leone, and longtime UFC veteran Din Thomas.

He built up another winning streak that earned him a title shot for the vacant Ring of Combat Bantamweight Championship. The fight marked the first time Pague fought at Bantamweight. He fought Steve De Angelis, defeating him via knockout in the second round.

Pague co-owns and operates his own gym, Disciple MMA. He also trains at the TapouT Ranch owned by Donald Cerrone.

The Ultimate Fighter
In 2011, Pague had signed with the UFC to compete on The Ultimate Fighter: Team Bisping vs. Team Miller. In the first episode, Pague fought Tateki Matsuda and won via majority decision (19-19, 20-18, 20-18) after two close rounds. The win gained Pague entry into the Ultimate Fighter house. He was selected as a part of Team Mayhem.

Pague next fought against Team Bisping's top Bantamweight pick, Louis Gaudinot. Pague won the fight in the second round via submission (rear-naked choke) to get into the semi-finals. The fight also won Pague and Gaudinot an additional $25,000 for the fan voted "Fight of the Season".

In the semi-finals Pague fought and lost to T.J. Dillashaw. Dillashaw controlled Pague on the ground throughout three rounds while landing heavy ground and pound en route to a unanimous decision.

Ultimate Fighting Championship
Pague officially made his UFC debut on December 3, 2011 at The Ultimate Fighter 14 Finale losing to John Albert via TKO in the first round. Pague was dropped by a combination from Albert in the opening moments, and then was put in the giftwrap position while getting hit with heavy ground and pound causing the referee to intervene.

Pague captured his first UFC win after defeating Jared Papazian on June 8, 2012 at UFC on FX 3. Pague won the fight via submission (rear-naked choke) in the first round.

Two weeks after his win over Papazian and with six days notice, Pague fought Ken Stone at UFC on FX 4 on June 22, 2012, replacing an injured Francisco Rivera. Pague was defeated via split decision.

Pague faced promotional newcomer Chico Camus on August 11, 2012, at UFC 150. Pague lost via unanimous decision (29-28, 30-27, 29-28).

Pague faced Yves Jabouin on June 15, 2013, at UFC 161. He lost the back-and-forth fight via split decision.

Pague faced promotional newcomer Kyoji Horiguchi on October 19, 2013 at UFC 166. Despite controlling Horiguchi for the first round, Pague lost via TKO in the second round.

On April 23, 2014, Pague was released from his UFC contract following a four-fight losing streak in the promotion.

Post-UFC career
In his first post-UFC fight, Pague faced D'Juan Owens at The Victorium: Episode 3 on July 12, 2014. He lost the fight via rear-naked choke.

Championships and accomplishments

Mixed martial arts
Ring of Combat
ROC Bantamweight Championship (One time)
Ultimate Fighting Championship
Fight of the Season (The Ultimate Fighter 14)

Personal life
Pague is a devoted Christian and has the word "Forgiven" tattooed across his chest.

Professional boxing record

| style="text-align:center;" colspan="8"|1 Win (0 knockouts, 1 decisions), 0 Losses, 0 Draws, 0 No Contests
|-  style="text-align:center; background:#e3e3e3;"
|  style="border-style:none none solid solid; "|Res.
|  style="border-style:none none solid solid; "|Record
|  style="border-style:none none solid solid; "|Opponent
|  style="border-style:none none solid solid; "|Type
|  style="border-style:none none solid solid; "|Rd., Time
|  style="border-style:none none solid solid; "|Date
|  style="border-style:none none solid solid; "|Location
|  style="border-style:none none solid solid; "|Notes
|- align=center
|Win
|1-0
|align=left| Rafael Davis 
|
|
|
|align=left|
|align=left|Debut.

Mixed martial arts record

|-
|Loss
|align=center|12–11
|Anthony Morgan
|Submission (rear-naked choke)
|World Cagefighting Championships 14
|
|align=center|2
|align=center|2:41
|Stroudsburg, Pennsylvania, United States
|
|-
|Win
|align=center|12–10
|Charlie Gathers
|Submission (rear-naked choke)
|World Cagefighting Championships 13
|
|align=center|1
|align=center|1:52
|Lancaster, Pennsylvania, United States
|
|-
|Loss
|align=center|11–10
|D'Juan Owens
|Submission (rear-naked choke)
|The Victorium: Episode 3
|
|align=center|3
|align=center|2:52
|Hayes, Virginia, United States
|
|-
|Loss
|align=center|11–9
|Kyoji Horiguchi
| TKO (punches)
|UFC 166
|
|align=center|2
|align=center|3:51
|Houston, Texas, United States
|
|-
|Loss
|align=center|11–8
|Yves Jabouin
| Decision (split)
|UFC 161
|
|align=center|3
|align=center|5:00
|Winnipeg, Manitoba, Canada
|
|-
|Loss
|align=center|11–7
|Chico Camus
| Decision (unanimous)
|UFC 150
|
|align=center|3
|align=center|5:00
|Denver, Colorado, United States
|
|-
|Loss
|align=center|11–6
|Ken Stone
| Decision (split)
|UFC on FX: Maynard vs. Guida
|
|align=center|3
|align=center|5:00
|Atlantic City, New Jersey, United States
|
|-
|Win
|align=center|11–5
|Jared Papazian
| Submission (rear-naked choke)
|UFC on FX: Johnson vs. McCall
|
|align=center|1
|align=center|3:21
|Sunrise, Florida, United States
|
|-
|Loss
|align=center|10–5
|John Albert
| TKO (punches)
|The Ultimate Fighter 14 Finale
|
|align=center|1
|align=center|1:09
|Las Vegas, Nevada, United States
|
|-
|Win
|align=center|10–4
|Steve De Angelis
|KO (punch)
|Ring of Combat 34
|
|align=center|2
|align=center|0:25
|Atlantic City, New Jersey, United States
|
|-
|Win
|align=center|9–4
|Bret Thomas
|Submission (punches)
|Shogun Fights 3
|
|align=center|1
|align=center|2:52
|Baltimore, Maryland, United States
|
|-
|Win
|align=center|8–4
|Dustin Caplinger
|TKO (punches)
|Fight Night in the Cage 1
|
|align=center|1
|align=center|2:19
|Lancaster, Pennsylvania, United States
|
|-
|Win
|align=center|7–4
|Scott Heckman
|Submission (rear-naked choke)
|Xtreme Caged Combat 2
|
|align=center|3
|align=center|0:42
|Feasterville, Pennsylvania, United States
|
|-
|Win
|align=center|6–4
|Justin Hickey
|Technical Submission (rear-naked choke)
|Ultimate Warrior Challenge 8
|
|align=center|1
|align=center|0:54
|Fairfax, Virginia, United States
|
|-
|Loss
|align=center|5–4
|Din Thomas
|TKO (doctor stoppage)
|World Extreme Fighting 41
|
|align=center|2
|align=center|2:14
|Pittsburgh, Pennsylvania, United States
|
|-
|Loss
|align=center|5–3
|Anthony Leone
|Submission (choke)
|PA Fighting Championships 1
|
|align=center|2
|align=center|4:58
|Harrisburg, Pennsylvania, United States
|
|-
|Loss
|align=center|5–2
|Jeff Lentz
|Decision (unanimous)
|The Arena Assault 1
|
|align=center|3
|align=center|5:00
|Philadelphia, Pennsylvania, United States
|
|-
|Win
|align=center|5–1
|Joel Roberts
|TKO (punches)
|Inkosi Promotions 1
|
|align=center|3
|align=center|3:14
|Bushkill, Pennsylvania, United States
|
|-
|Win
|align=center|4–1
|Will Childs
|Submission (armbar)
|The Smoky Mountain Brawl
|
|align=center|1
|align=center|1:47
|Asheville, North Carolina, United States
|
|-
|Win
|align=center|3–1
|Biff Walizer
|Submission (rear-naked choke)
|Respect Is Earned 2
|
|align=center|3
|align=center|3:03
|Oaks, Pennsylvania, United States
|
|-
|Win
|align=center|2–1
|Charles Cooper
|Submission (ankle lock)
|Southern Fight League 2
|
|align=center|1
|align=center|0:45
|Greenville, North Carolina, United States
|
|-
|Win
|align=center|1–1
|John Myers
|Submission (triangle choke)
|Southern Fight League 1
|
|align=center|1
|align=center|1:05
|Greenville, North Carolina, United States
|
|-
|Loss
|align=center|0–1
|Jon Owens
|KO (punch)
|The Carolina Crown
|
|align=center|1
|align=center|0:18
|Raleigh, North Carolina, United States
|

Amateur mixed martial arts record

|-
|Win
|align=center|7–4
|Joey Ponce
|Submission (triangle choke)
|Valhalla MMA 8
|
|align=center|1
|align=center|1:20
|Richmond, Virginia, United States
|
|-
|Win
|align=center|6–4
|Don Torrenti
|Submission (armbar)
|Valhalla MMA 7
|
|align=center|1
|align=center|0:26
|Sterling, Virginia, United States
|
|-
|Win
|align=center|5–4
|Justin Dalton
|Submission (rear-naked choke)
|Total Cage Combat: Retaliation 
|
|align=center|1
|align=center|0:43
|Richmond, Virginia, United States
|
|-
|Loss
|align=center|4–4
|Khris Gonzalez
|Decision (unanimous)
|Valhalla MMA 4
|
|align=center|3
|align=center|5:00
|Richmond, Virginia, United States
|
|-
|Win
|align=center|4–3
|Doug Hunsucker
|Submission (rear-naked choke)
|Valhalla MMA 3: Domination
|
|align=center|3
|align=center|1:38
|Fort Lee, Virginia, United States
|
|-
|Loss
|align=center|3–3
|Luiz Rodrigues
|Decision (unanimous)
|Valhalla MMA 2
|
|align=center|3
|align=center|5:00
|Virginia, United States
|
|-
|Win
|align=center|3–2
|Joey Allen
|TKO (punches)
|Combat Sports Challenge 19
|
|align=center|1
|align=center|0:34
|United States
|
|-
|Win
|align=center|2–2
|Doug Hunsucker
|Submission (rear-naked choke)
|CSC 17: River City Rumble 4
|
|align=center|2
|align=center|N/A
|Mechanicsville, Virginia, United States
|
|-
|Loss
|align=center|1–2
|Jared Weiner
|Submission (rear-naked choke)
|CSC 15: East Coast Brawl 6
|
|align=center|1
|align=center|1:52
|Fredericksburg, Virginia, United States
|
|-
|Loss
|align=center|1–1
|Siyam Yousefi
|Disqualification 
|CSC 14: River City Rumble 3
|
|align=center|1
|align=center|N/A
|Mechanicsville, Virginia, United States
|
|-
|Win
|align=center|1–0
|Zac Allen
|Submission (triangle choke)
|CSC 12: River City Rumble 2
|
|align=center|1
|align=center|3:09
|Mechanicsville, Virginia, United States
|

Bare knuckle record

|-
|Win
|align=center|1–1
|Eddie Hoch
|KO (punch)
|BKFC Fight Night: New York 2
| 
|align=center|1
|align=center|0:45
|Salamanca, New York, United States
|
|-
|Loss
|align=center|0–1
|Jake Young
|DQ (repeated illegal ground strikes)	
|BKFC Fight Night: New York
| 
|align=center|1
|align=center|0:57
|Salamanca, New York, United States
|
|-

References

External links
Official UFC Profile

 

Bantamweight mixed martial artists
American male mixed martial artists
1987 births
Living people
Featherweight mixed martial artists
Lightweight mixed martial artists
Mixed martial artists utilizing boxing
Mixed martial artists from Pennsylvania
Ultimate Fighting Championship male fighters